James Blanco Castillo (born June 15, 1981), known professionally as James Blanco, is a Filipino singer-songwriter, actor, and model. A freelance actor, he is known for his roles in Ikaw Lang ang Mamahalin (2001 – 2002), Rubi (2010), Lorenzo's Time (2012), One More Chance (2007), Now and Forever: Ganti (2005) and in the 2014 GMA afternoon primetime Yagit as Victor Guison. Blanco was also notable for his roles in the youth oriented shows Click (1999 – 2002) and Kahit Kailan (2002 – 2003), both on GMA Network.

Filmography

Film

Television/Digital

Awards and nominations

References

1981 births
Living people
Male actors from Manila
Filipino male television actors
GMA Network personalities
Star Magic
ABS-CBN personalities
TV5 (Philippine TV network) personalities